The  is the national deposit insurance authority of Japan. It was established in 1971 and is headquartered in Tokyo. Masanori Tanabe has been Chair of the organization since 2010. Due to 1990s' Japanese banking rescue, the company has preferred shares of 29 banks remain uncalled  through The Restoration and Collection Company, its subsidiary . New Scientist named it as one of the 147 "superconnected" organizations "with disproportionate power over the global economy."

References

External links
 

Banks established in 1971
Government-owned companies based in Tokyo
Banking in Japan
Deposit insurance
1971 establishments in Japan